Zote is a Mexican company primarily known for its laundry soap. The soap is popular for hand washing clothes and pretreating oily stains.

Zote's best known product is a pink bar of soap which is intended for laundry.

History
The soap brand was started in 1970 by Esteban González Padilla. The name is a play on words in Spanish; Jabón-Zote, the -ote suffix emphasizing a large size.

The soap is produced in the Fábrica de Jabón La Corona in Ecatepec, Mexico State.

Most of the brand's sales are domestic, with 15% of sales from markets outside of Mexico, primarily in the United States and South America. According to the company, soap sales increased by 20% in 2020 amid the covid pandemic.

Products
The ingredients of the pink Zote bar are sodium tallowate (animal fat), sodium cocoate, Citronella oil (fragrance), glycerin and optical brightener.

Other laundry products include specialized bars of soap, indicated by the color, laundry flakes and liquid detergent.

Non-laundry products include consumer items like cooking oil Aceite 123 and bath soap Rosa Venus. Industrial items include vegetable oil Grano de Oro, sold primarily to baking companies, and pharmaceutical grade glycerin.

See also
 Fels-Naptha
 List of cleaning products

References 

Cleaning product brands
Soap brands
Mexican brands